Architimus was a writer of ancient Greece. His date is uncertain, but was some time before the 1st century CE. We know him to have written a work about Arcadia.

Notes

Ancient Greek writers
Ancient Greek writers known only from secondary sources